Soma Dam is a rockfill dam located in Aomori Prefecture in Japan. The dam is used for flood control and irrigation. The catchment area of the dam is 25.9 km2. The dam impounds about 54  ha of land when full and can store 6560 thousand cubic meters of water. The construction of the dam was started on 1974 and completed in 2003.

References

Dams in Aomori Prefecture
2003 establishments in Japan